are a Japanese rock band, consisting of keyboardist and composer Mickie Yoshino, vocalist Yukihide Takekawa, guitarist Takami Asano and Yoji Yoshizawa, bassist Steve Fox, and drummer Tommy Snyder. Over their 40-year career (with hiatuses), Godiego released 27 singles and 55 albums in Japan, with lyrics written variably in English by longtime collaborator lyricist Yoko Narahashi.

They are perhaps best known for performing the song "Monkey Magic" for the 1978 television series Saiyūki which was brought over to the United Kingdom as Monkey. This led to several releases through BBC Records, including "Monkey Magic", "Gandhara", and the LP Monkey and several of their records charted in the UK. Their theme from The Water Margin was their sole UK Top 40 hit. Godiego are also known for performing the theme song "THE GALAXY EXPRESS 999" for the Galaxy Express 999 film and the soundtrack for the 1977 film House. They were the first rock band to play in the People's Republic of China and Nepal, and inspired the name for the band Monkey Majik (the group's original drummer was British and watched the show as a child). Lead guitarist Takami Asano worked on the soundtrack of the Nintendo DS game Shin Megami Tensei: Devil Survivor, while vocalist Yukihide Takekawa composed the soundtrack for the Super NES video game Soul Blazer.

Members
 - Keyboards, vocals, band leader
 - Vocals, keyboards
 - Guitars, vocals (Died 12 May 2020)
 - Bass, vocals
 - Drums, vocals
 - Guitars, Bass, vocals

Tommy Snyder is American and Steve Fox is Japanese-American. Steve Fox left the band in the middle of the band's golden era because he converted to Christianity, as he felt that he had to make a serious commitment with his faith. From the 1980s to the 1990s, Fox engaged in missionary work in Japan and Hawaii, and he broadcast an evangelistic radio program. In 1999, Steve Fox rejoined Godiego.
Guitarist and backing vocalist Takami Asano died Tuesday May 12, 2020 after collapsing at his home. He was 68. A cause of death had not been released, as of 13 May 2020.

Discography

Singles 
 
 
 
 
 
 "The Water Margin" (1977)
 
 
 
 
 
 
 
 
 
 
 
 
 
 
 
 
 "Java wa Java in the book of Godiego" (1999)
 "Monkey Magic 2006" (2006)
 "One for Everyone" (2006)
 "Big Mama" (2007)
 "Walking On" (2011)

Albums 
 
 
 
 Dead End (1977)
 
 
 Kaleidoscope (1978)
 
 
 
 
 Magic Capsule (1979)
 London Celebration (1980)
 Kathmandu (1980)
 
 Godiego Hit Special (1980)
 
 M.O.R. (1981)
 CM Song Graffiti Vol. 2 (1982)
 Hit Collection (1982)
 Favourite Collection (1982)
 Carry Love Song Collection (1983)
 
 Original Hits Disc (1984)
 
 One Dimension Man (1984)
 Side-A Collection (1984)
 What a Beautiful Name (1999)
 Intermission/Godiego Final Live+2 (1985)
 Best Collection (1986)
 W Deluxe (1987)
 New Music Beat Choice 8 (1988)
 Twin Deluxe (1990)
 15th Anniversary Godiego Box (1991)
 Best Album (1992)
 Godiego Great Best Vol. 1: Japanese Version (1994)
 Godiego Great Best Vol. 2: English Version (1994)
 Return of Godiego/Mickie Yoshino's Best Selection (1994)
 Godiego Single Collection (1994)
 Godiego Single Collection Vol. 2: B Side Collection (1995)
 Godiego... What A Beautiful Name (1999)
 Gold Godiego: Now And Then (1999)
 Godiego Box (2008)
 
 The Glacier Fox: Alternate Soundtracks + Yukihide Takekawa Home Recording Demo in 1978 (2009)

References

External links
  
  at Universal Music 

Japanese rock music groups
Universal Music Japan artists